Paraguay–South Korea relations are foreign relations between Paraguay and South Korea. Both countries established diplomatic relations on June 15, 1962. Paraguay has an embassy in Seoul and South Korea has an embassy in Asuncion. There are about 6,000 people of Korean descent living in Paraguay.

External links 
 Paraguayan Ministry of Foreign Relations about relations with Korea
 Paraguayan embassy in Seoul
 South Korean Ministry of Foreign Affairs and Trade about relations with Paraguay
  Korean embassy in Asuncion (in Korean and Spanish only)

 
Korea, South
Bilateral relations of South Korea